Hashimiya District is a district of the Babil Governorate, Iraq. The seat of the district is Al Hashimiyah.

Districts of Babil Governorate